is a Japanese politician and member of the House of Representatives, representing the Tokyo 6th district. He is a member of the Liberal Democratic Party.

Onishi was born in Edogawa, Tokyo. He graduated from Kokugakuin University and worked as an assistant to Diet members Takashi Fukaya and Ichiro Shimamura before entering politics in 1975 as a member of the Edogawa city assembly. He served as chairman of the assembly from 1984 to 1993, and then in the Tokyo metropolitan assembly from 1993 to 2007. He was a proportional representation candidate in the 2007 Japanese House of Councillors election but failed to win a seat. He remained active within the LDP's administrative ranks and was elected to the House of Representatives in the 2012 general election.

In 2015 LDP leadership criticized Onishi for his suggestion that businesses should stop advertising in press outlets that criticize the government. In 2017 Onishi drew media attention for controversial comments about cancer patients during a discussion of secondhand smoking regulations.

References

External links
 

1946 births
People from Edogawa, Tokyo
Living people
Members of the House of Representatives (Japan)
Members of the Tokyo Metropolitan Assembly
Liberal Democratic Party (Japan) politicians